HMS K10 was a K class submarine built by Vickers, Barrow-in-Furness. She was laid down on 28 June 1915. She was commissioned on 26 June 1917. K10 was sold on 4 November 1921. K10 foundered in tow on 10 January 1922. It had a complement of fifty-nine crew members and a length of

Design
K10 displaced  when at the surface and  while submerged. The submarine was powered by two oil-fired Yarrow Shipbuilders boilers each supplying one geared Brown-Curtis or Parsons steam turbine; this developed 10,500 ship horsepower (7,800 kW) to drive two  screws. Submerged power came from four electric motors each producing . It was also had an  diesel engine to be used when steam was being raised, or instead of raising steam.

K10 was armed with ten  torpedo tubes, two  deck guns, and a  anti-aircraft gun. Its torpedo tubes were four in the bows, four in the midship section firing to the sides, and two were mounted on the deck in rotating mountings. Its complement was fifty-nine crew members.

References

Bibliography
 

 

Ships built in Barrow-in-Furness
British K-class submarines
Royal Navy ship names
1916 ships